David Schmidtz (born 1955) is a Canadian-American philosopher. He is Presidential Chair of Moral Science at West Virginia University's Chambers College of Business and Economics. He is also editor-in-chief of the journal Social Philosophy & Policy. Previously, he was Kendrick Professor of Philosophy and Eller Chair of Service-Dominant Logic at the University of Arizona. While at Arizona, he founded and served as inaugural head of the Department of Political Economy and Moral Science.

Education and career
Schmidtz grew up in Humboldt, Saskatchewan, Canada. In 1983, he received his B.A. in philosophy from the University of Saskatchewan. He earned an M.A. in philosophy from the University of Arizona in 1985, and an M.A. in economics, also from the University of Arizona, in 1987. Schmidtz earned his PhD at the University of Arizona in 1988 under the direction of Allen Buchanan. He also studied with Joel Feinberg and Keith Lehrer, Holly Martin Smith, R. Mark Isaac, and Vernon Smith.

In 1988, Schmidtz took a job as an assistant professor at Yale University. He was promoted to associate professor in 1991. He left Yale in 1994, taught at Bowling Green State University, and joined the University of Arizona in 1995. He was promoted to Professor (of Philosophy, joint in Economics) in 1998.

Schmidtz taught first-year property as a visiting professor at Florida State University College of Law in 2007.  In the 2014–15 academic year, he was a national Phi Beta Kappa Visiting Scholar and John Stuart Mill Professor at Hamburg University. Schmidtz is the founding director of the Freedom Center at the University of Arizona. Among his former doctoral students are Jason Brennan.

Philosophical work

He is author of Elements of Justice, Rational Choice and Moral Agency, co-author of Social Welfare and Individual Responsibility (a "For & Against" book with Robert Goodin) and editor of a volume on Robert Nozick in the Cambridge University Press "Contemporary Philosophy in Focus" series. He also co-edited two editions of Environmental Ethics: What Really Matters, What Really Works with Elizabeth Willott (1955-2015); a third edition of this book with co-editor Dan Shahar was published in 2018. His first book, The Limits of Government: An Essay on the Public Goods Argument, combined his interests in moral philosophy and economic analysis. Schmidtz has also written on rational choice theory and environmental ethics.

He has published articles in many journals, including the Journal of Philosophy, Ethics, and Political Theory along with reviews in journals such as Philosophical Review, Canadian Journal of Philosophy, and Mind. Many of his essays have been (or are in the process of being) reprinted, and have been translated into other languages.

Thirteen of his essays (one previously unpublished, on Peter Singer's approach to moral theory) were published as Person, Polis, Planet: Essays in Applied Philosophy in 2008. A Brief History of Liberty, with co-author Jason Brennan, appeared in 2010. He co-authored the introductory textbook Commercial Society: A Primer on Ethics and Economics with Cathleen Johnson and Robert Lusch and the book Debating Education: Is There a Role for Markets? with Harry Brighouse, both published in 2020.

Selected publications

Books

Articles and chapters

 
 
 
 
 
 
 
 
 
 
 
 
 
 
  With commentaries by Robin Attfield, Thom Brooks, Greg Bognar, Martin Drenthen, Matt Ferkany, Kendy M. Hess, Dan C. Shahar, James P. Sterba, and Gary Varner.
  A review of Amartya Sen's The Idea of Justice.

See also
 Canadian philosophy
 List of Canadian philosophers
 American philosophy
 List of American philosophers

References

External links
 David Schmidtz's homepage
 
 

1955 births
Living people
Canadian emigrants to the United States
University of Arizona alumni
Yale University faculty
Bowling Green State University faculty
Florida State University faculty
20th-century American philosophers
21st-century American philosophers
Philosophers from Florida
American political philosophers
Libertarian theorists
University of Arizona faculty
Philosophers from Arizona